Kasba Assembly constituency is a Legislative Assembly constituency of South 24 Parganas district in the Indian state of West Bengal.

Overview
As per orders of the Delimitation Commission, No. 149 Kasba Assembly constituency is composed of the following: Ward Nos. 66, 67, 91, 92, 107 and 108 of Kolkata Municipal Corporation.

Kasba Assembly constituency is part of No. 23 Kolkata Dakshin (Lok Sabha constituency).

Members of Legislative Assembly

Election results

2021
In the 2021 elections, Javed Ahmed Khan of AITC defeated his nearest rival, Dr. Indranil Khan of BJP.

2016

2011
In the 2011 elections, Javed Ahmed Khan of Trinamool Congress defeated his nearest rival Shatarup Ghosh of CPI(M).

References

Notes

Citations

Assembly constituencies of West Bengal
Politics of Kolkata